Grevillea marriottii is a species of flowering plant in the family Proteaceae and is endemic to a restricted area of inland Western Australia. It is an open shrub with both simple linear, and divided leaves with linear lobes, and clusters of whitish flowers with a white style sometimes tinged with pink.

Description
The edges of the leaves are rolled under, the partly-exposed lower surface shaggy-hairy.

Taxonomy
Grevillea marriottii was first formally described in 1990 by Peter M. Olde in The Western Australian Naturalist from specimens collected near Mount Holland in 1988. The specific epithet (marriottii) honours Neil R. Marriott.

Distribution and habitat
This grevillea grows in sand on hills or laterite and is only known from near Mount Holland, south of Southern Cross in the Coolgardie bioregion of inland Western Australia.

Conservation status
Grevillea marriottii is listed as "Priority One" by the Government of Western Australia Department of Biodiversity, Conservation and Attractions, meaning that it is known from only one or a few locations which are potentially at risk.

See also
 List of Grevillea species

References

marriottii
Proteales of Australia
Eudicots of Western Australia
Plants described in 1990